Kumarganj is a village in Kumarganj CD Block in Balurghat subdivision of Dakshin Dinajpur district in the state of West Bengal, India.

Geography

Location

The Atreyee flows past Kumarganj.

In the map alongside, all places marked on the map are linked in the full screen version.

Police station
Kumarganj police station under West Bengal police has jurisdiction over Kumarganj CD Block.

CD Block HQ
The headquarters of Kumarganj CD Block is at Kumarganj.

Demographics
As per the 2011 Census of India, Kumarganj had a total population of 3,920, of which 2,013 (51%) were males and 1,907 (49%) were females. Population below 6 years was 378. The total number of literates in Kumarganj was 2,642 (74.59% of the population over 6 years).

Transport
The Kumarganj-Patiram Road links Kumarganj with State Highway 10.

Education
Kumarganj College was established at Kumarganj in 2016. Affiliated with the University of Gour Banga it offers honours courses in Bengali, English, Sanskrit, education, history, philosophy and political science, and a general course in arts.

Healthcare
Kumarganj Rural Hospital at Kumarganj (with 30 beds) is the main medical facility in Kumarganj CD Block. There are primary health centres at Penitora (Samjia PHC) (with 10 beds), Bathur (with 10 beds) and Deor (with 10 beds).

References

Villages in Dakshin Dinajpur district